Heggenes is the administrative centre of Øystre Slidre Municipality in Innlandet county, Norway. The village is located on the east shore of the lake Heggefjorden. The Norwegian County Road 51 runs through the village.

References

Øystre Slidre
Villages in Innlandet